The Hulan River (Chinese: 呼兰河; Pinyin: Hūlán Hé; English: Call Orchid) is a river in Heilongjiang Province, China.

The Hulan rises in the Lesser Khingan mountains, south of Yichun. It flows west past Tieli and north of Suihua. After the confluence with the Tongken River, it turns south to join the Songhua River in Hulan County, where it flows into the new Dadingshan Reservoir, just east of Harbin, .

The river meanders extensively across the Northeast China Plain, creating many bifurcations and oxbow lakes. The approximate length is 350 km, but there is often more than one stream, and the actual distance, including all the bends, is 532 km. The area of the catchment basin is 31,207 km2.

It has a wide floodplain of fertile black soil. After a comprehensive management plan for the river basin was implemented in the 1950s, it became a center of production for grain, flax, and sugar beet.

There is a tributary called the Xiaohulan River (Little Hulan), which flows northwest to join the main river west of Tieli. Other tributaries include the Yijimi, Ougen, Liu, Gemuke, Nuomin, Ni, and Tongken Rivers. 

On 1 April 2020, the river suffered pollution from Molybdenum and related refining materials, from a smelter in Yichun.

See also
 Hulan County
 Tales of Hulan River, by Xiao Hong. The book is not really about the river itself, but describes life in Hulan County, an eastern suburb of Harbin, on the west bank of the river, in the period 1910-1930.

References

Songhua River
Rivers of Heilongjiang
Harbin